Sharmeena Begum (sometimes transliterated as Shamina; born 1999) is one of the jihadi brides. She left the United Kingdom to join the Islamic State of Iraq and the Levant (ISIL) in December 2014. Two months later, in February 2015, school friends Amira Abase, Shamima Begum, and Kadiza Sultana joined her in occupied Syria. Begum is one of the youngest British teenagers to join ISIL.

In February 2019 Begum was described as "missing".

Background 

Sharmeena Begum was born to Shahnaz Begum and Mohammad Uddin. She was raised by her mother until her father joined them in the UK in 2007. Begum's mother died of cancer in January 2014. Her father remarried in September 2014, and Begum left for Syria in December 2014. Begum's father, Mohammad Uddin, said that her behaviour changed; she stopped listening to western music, and started going to her room to pray, but he assumed this was a grief reaction to her mother's death. At the time of her father's second marriage she lived with her grandmother.

Members of her family were sure Begum was targeted for recruitment by a group, known as the "Sisters Forum", within the Islamic Forum of Europe, that met at an east London Mosque.

Women from the group that recruited her have been described as "brainwashing" her, telling her she would meet her recently deceased mother in paradise if she died a martyr. Women from the group are reported to have taken her to the airport, for her departure.

Sharmeena Begum was friends with Amira Abase, Shamima Begum, (unrelated) and Kadiza Sultana who left for Syria a couple of months later. All four attended Bethnal Green Academy.

Joining ISIL 
After her mother died, Begum became increasingly interested in religious themes, although her family had previously described her as non-religious. She is said to have begun to pray and stopped listening to western music. Begum was not getting along with her new stepmother, and had gone to live with one of her grandmothers.

According to the police, Begum was encouraged by two unidentified women to join ISIL and that those two had taken her to Gatwick Airport on a flight to Turkey, from where she made her way to Syria. According to reports by the family, she purchased the plane ticket with £500 she had persuaded her grandmother to give her. She used her grandmother's passport for her travels, telling her she needed to borrow the passport for her schoolwork.

The women who encouraged her are thought to be members of the East London Mosque in Whitechapel and that they are members of a group called the "Sisters Forum" within the Islamic Forum of Europe. The mosque, however, denied any involvement in the radicalisation of Begum.

Two weeks after her departure, she reportedly called her father to inform him that she did not intend to return.

Following his daughter's disappearance, Mr Uddin informed the police of his suspicion that his daughter might have been encouraged by Islamists and that her three friends might be at risk as well. Police subsequently approached the three girls to question them about Sharmeena. As they were minors, they gave them letters to pass to their parents to seek permission. The letters were not passed on and police did not follow up.

Two months after her departure, she was joined by her three friends from Bethnal Green Academy who had also made their way to Syria via Turkey. According to reports, they were able to meet up in Raqqa.

It is thought she married a Bosnian fighter who has since been killed. Her current status is unknown; she has been described as missing. Shamima Begum reported last seeing her in Baghuz in June 2018.

Jasmine Jawhar, author of "Terrorists' use of the internet: The case of DAESH", characterized Begum and her school friends as being "mesmerised by the romantic idea of jihad."

Criticism of the response of security officials 
Begum's travel to Islamic State-occupied Syria, followed by the travel of three of her friends, triggered a discussion as to whether UK security officials could have prevented the other girls following her example.
The parents of fellow students say they were unaware that Begum had travelled to Islamic State territory. Parents who were aware assumed she had returned to Bangladesh out of grief, following the death of her mother.

Begum's father was critical that his warnings to police regarding his concern that her friends might follow her example, were ignored.

On 19 February 2019, Cressida Dick, Commissioner of London's Metropolitan Police Service, defended the Police against claims they should have been able to anticipate Begum's friends following her example. Dick disputed that Begum was travelling on the same plane as another teenage recruit, who was prevented from travelling. Dick acknowledged another 15-year-old girl was prevented from travelling the night Begum left, but said she thought the other girl was on a different plane. As for the criticism that the police could have prevented her friends from following her example, she asserted that the police did speak with her friends, but, at the time, saw them merely as witnesses, not potential victims, because "knowing somebody's intentions is 'extremely complicated".

See also 

 Brides of ISIL
 British Bangladeshi
 List of British Bangladeshis
 List of people who disappeared
 Sexual jihad
 United Kingdom and ISIL

References 

1999 births
2010s missing person cases
British expatriates in Syria
Date of birth missing (living people)
English Islamists
English people of Bangladeshi descent
Islamic State of Iraq and the Levant and the United Kingdom
Islamic State of Iraq and the Levant members
Missing person cases in Syria
People from Bethnal Green
Possibly living people